Wunstorf is a town in the district of Hanover, in Lower Saxony, Germany. It is situated approximately 22 km west of Hanover. The following localities belong to the town of Wunstorf: Blumenau (with Liethe), Bokeloh, Großenheidorn, Idensen (with Idensermoor and Niengraben), Klein Heidorn, Kolenfeld, Luthe, Mesmerode, Steinhude, and Wunstorf.

The town gave its name to nearby Wunstorf Air Base of the German Air Force. To the west of the city, Steinhude and Großenheidorn are located on the shores of Lake Steinhuder Meer.

Demography
 1830 – c. 1,910
 1840 – c. 2,300
 1871 – 2,455
 1885 – 2,963
 1905 – 4,523
 1949 – 11,610 (of this 3,490 were refugees and displaced persons)
 1998 – 40,848
 2000 – 41,474
 2005 – 42,215
 2010 – 41,244

Local council
The local elections on September 11, 2016, had the following results:
 SPD: 16 seats
 CDU: 13 seats
 Alliance '90/The Greens: 6 seats
 FDP: 2 seats
 AfD: 4 seats
 Fraktionslos:(without party) 1 seat

Transport
Wunstorf has 2 exits on motorway A 2.

Wunstorf railway station has 4 trains per hour to Hanover (a mix of local and regional trains), and 2 trains per hour each to Minden and Nienburg. The local bus network is designed to allow connections with trains to/from Hanover.
The nearest commercial airport is the Hannover Airport about 25 km via motorways A2 and A352.

Twin towns – sister cities

Wunstorf is twinned with:
 Flers, France
 Wolmirstedt, Germany

Notable people
Polykarp Leyser IV (1690–1728), Protestant theologian, philosopher, physician, jurist and historian
Joost Schmidt (1893–1948), typographer, painter and teacher at the Bauhaus
Ernst Jünger (1895–1998), writer
Andreas Spengler (born 1947), psychiatrist and psychotherapist
Heinz-Joachim Barchmann (born 1950), politician (SPD), Member of Bundestag since 2009

Gallery

References

 
Hanover Region